The Keleta is a river in Ethiopia.

See also
 List of rivers of Ethiopia

Rivers of Ethiopia